The flag of Voronezh Oblast, a federal subject of Russia, was adopted 5 July 2005. The flag is a field of red, with a grouping of yellow rocks on the hoist side. Over the rocks, a liquid (spring waters) pours out of a turned-over white vase. It is also on the Voronezhan coat of arms. The ratio of the flag is 2:3.

The pile of stones represents the steep right bank of the city of Voronezh, while the water pouring from the jug represents the flowing Don River, more specifically, the Voronezh River tributary. The jug itself, a "creation of skilled human hands", symbolises the diligence of Voronezh's people. It first appeared on the coat of arms of the city of Voronezh approved by the emperor on September 21, 1781 (Old Style).

According to Resolution #292-II adopted by the Voronezh City Duma on September 26, 2008 for the city flag, the argent (silver) of the jug and water is symbolic of nobility, purity, justice, generosity and peace. Gules (red) of the field is the colour for vital force, fortitude, festivity, beauty and labour which characterises the city of Voronezh as an industrially developed centre. The golden of the rocks signifies harvest, exuberance and fertility, symbolising a well developed agrarian sector of economy. At the same time the gold represents nobility, respect, honour, mental power, light and spirituality.

References

 Flags of the World

Flag of Voronezh Oblast
Flags of the federal subjects of Russia
Voronezh